Chiefs of Staff is the Des Plaines, Illinois-based Barbershop quartet that won the 1988 SPEBSQSA international competition.

Discography
 Memories (Cassette, CD)
 Solid Gold (LP, Cassette, CD)
 Tribute (LP, Cassette, CD)
 National Anthems on Tape with Northbrook chorus, (Tape, Cassette)

References

External links
 Discography from Mike Barkley's Monster list
 AIC entry

Barbershop quartets
Barbershop Harmony Society